James Wilson (1816–1900) was a prominent Victorian architect practising in Bath, Somerset and partner in the firm Wilson & Willcox.

On 12 January 1843 he married Maria Buckley of Llanelli, and in 1846 they had a son, James Buckley Wilson, who followed his father to also become an architect.

List of buildings
Wesleyan Methodist Chapel, Bridport, Dorset (1838)
St. Stephen's Church, Walcot, Bath (1840–1845)
Church of St Leonard, Shipham (1843)
Kingswood School, Bath (1851)
Royal High School, Bath (1858)
Church of St Mary, Charlcombe (restoration) (1857–1861)
Holy Trinity Church, Norton Malreward (rebuilding) (1860–1861)
 National Westminster Bank, 24 Milsom Street, Bath (1865)
Carmarthen Public Rooms (Assembly Rooms), King Street, Carmarthen,(1854)

References

1816 births
1900 deaths
19th-century English architects
Architects from Bath, Somerset
English ecclesiastical architects
Gothic Revival architects